Ilanga maculicincta is a species of sea snail, a marine gastropod mollusk in the family Solariellidae.

Description
The size of the shell attains 8.6 mm.

Distribution
The marine species occurs off KwaZuluNatal to Southwest Transkei, Rep. South Africa

References

External links
 To World Register of Marine Species

maculicincta
Gastropods described in 1987